Camille de Sartiges (15 June 1888 – 11 May 1971) was a French equestrian. He competed at the 1920 Summer Olympics and the 1924 Summer Olympics.

References

1888 births
1971 deaths
French male equestrians
Olympic equestrians of France
Equestrians at the 1920 Summer Olympics
Equestrians at the 1924 Summer Olympics
Sportspeople from Cantal
20th-century French people